Mangilal Arya (1918 – 23 August 1992) was an Indian freedom fighter and social reformer.

Early life 
Shri Mangilal Arya was born in 1918 at village Ararka, Ajmer district, Rajasthan. Arya, whose actual birth name was Mangilal Goyal, was the son of Sultan Goyal. He completed his basic education up to 10th standard in the local area of Ajmer district. Later on at the age of 16 he married Gulab Devi.

Career 
Arya devoted his career to Arya Samaj, the Hindu reform movement of Swami Dayananda Saraswati, working as a freedom fighter and social reformer.  He took part in the satyagraha organized by Arya Samaj in Hyderabad from 1938 to 1939.

After India won independence in 1947, Arya continued to work as a social reformer for Arya Samaj in Ajmer, and was given the title of "Mantri Ji".

Awards and honours 
 On 15 August 1988 Arya was awarded "Tamra Patra" by Rajiv Gandhi, Prime Minister of India.
 From 1986 to 1992 while Arya was alive he was honoured as Freedom Fighter for Indian Independence by the District collector of Ajmer on every Republic Day and Independence Day celebration at Sardar Patel Stadium in Ajmer.
 After his death his wife Gulab Devi was honoured for her husband's contribution for Independence of India.

1918 births
1992 deaths
People from Ajmer district
Arya Samajis
Indian independence activists from Rajasthan